Pontwalby Halt railway station served the area of Pont Walby, in the historical area of Glamorganshire, Wales, from 1911 to 1964 on the Vale of Neath Railway.

History 
The station was opened on 1 May 1911 by the Great Western Railway. It replaced British Rhondda Halt. It closed on 15 June 1964.

References 

Disused railway stations in Rhondda Cynon Taf
Former Great Western Railway stations
Beeching closures in Wales
Railway stations in Great Britain opened in 1911
Railway stations in Great Britain closed in 1964
1911 establishments in Wales
1964 disestablishments in Wales